Leon Kruczkowski (28 June 1900 – 1 August 1962) was a Polish writer, publicist and public figure. He wrote books and dramas and was prominent in Polish theatre of the post-World War II period. His best known work is the drama Niemcy ('The Germans'), written in 1949.

A left-wing activist before World War II, Kruczkowski spent the war in German prisoner of war camps. After the war, he became active in politics of communist-ruled Poland. He was a deputy minister of culture and art in 1945–1948, member of Polish parliament (Sejm) from 1947 to 1962, and member of the Polish Council of State from 1957. He had significant influence on Polish cultural policies of the period.

Biography

Kruczkowski was born on 28 June 1900 in Kraków. While completing his higher education in chemistry and technology, he published his first poems around 1918 and 1919. He moved to the Dąbrowa Basin, where in 1928 he published his first poetry anthology, Młoty nad światem ('Hammers over the World'), and in 1932 his first novel, a "peasant response to Juliusz Słowacki's Kordian", entitled Kordian i cham ('Kordian and the Boor').

He became a full-time writer, moved back to Kraków and in 1935 wrote the first of his dramas, Bohater naszych czasów ('Hero of our Times'). It was rewritten three years later as Przygoda z Vaterlandem ('An Adventure with Vaterland'), both versions notable for their strong critique of Nazism. He also wrote essays published in leftist magazines and newspapers, and political brochures: Człowiek i powszedność ('Man and Daily Reality', 1936), W klimacie dyktatury ('In the Climate of Dictatorship', 1938), Dlaczego jestem socjalistą? ('Why am I a Socialist?', 1938). He wrote two more novels, Pawie pióra ('Peacock Feathers', 1935) and Sidła ('A Trap', 1937).

After the German Invasion of Poland, in which Kruczkowski fought in the Polish army as an officer, he was arrested and spent the war in a prisoner-of-war camp, where he was an educational and cultural activist (organized a theatre). Two of his novels, not finished before the invasion, were lost during the war. After the war, he returned to his literary career, writing more dramas for the theater. His 1948 Odwety ('Retributions') was well received, but it was his 1949 Niemcy ('The Germans'), a drama addressing the issue of Germany's moral responsibility for World War II, that gained him international recognition. It was translated into 14 languages.

Kruczkowski also became a political activist and politician. He was a deputy minister of culture and art during 1945–1948 and chairman of the Main Council of the Polish Writers' Union in 1949–1956. Member of the State National Council from 1945 to 1947, member of the Sejm from 1947 to 1962, and from 1957 also a member of the Polish Council of State.

He was an active and vocal supporter of the new communist order in Poland, involved in politicizing the culture and in introducing the style and doctrine of socialist realism. Recognized as a major literary figure, Kruczkowski also exerted significant influence on cultural policy of post-war Poland.

Awards

He received several Polish state prizes, including the Order of the Builders of People's Poland, and the Lenin Peace Prize (1953).

Works

 Młoty nad światem ('Hammers over the World', 1928), poetry anthology
 Kordian i cham ('Kordian and the Boor', 1932), novel, adapted to theater in 1935
 Pawie pióra ('Peacock Feathers', 1935), novel
 Bohater naszych czasów ('Hero of our Times', 1935), drama, rewritten as Przygoda z Vaterlandem ('An Adventure with Vaterland', 1938)
 Sidła ('A Trap', 1937), novel
 Odwety ('Retributions', 1948), drama
 Niemcy ('The Germans', 1949), drama
 Juliusz i Ethel ('Julius and Ethel', 1954), drama
 Odwiedziny ('The Visit', 1955), drama
 Pierwszy dzień wolności ('The First Day of Freedom', 1959), drama
 Śmierć gubernatora ('Death of the Governor', 1961), drama
 Szkice z piekła uczciwych ('Sketches from Hell of the Honest', 1963), short stories anthology

References

1900 births
1962 deaths
Writers from Kraków
People from the Kingdom of Galicia and Lodomeria
Polish Austro-Hungarians
Polish Workers' Party politicians
Polish United Workers' Party members
Members of the State National Council
Members of the Polish Sejm 1947–1952
Members of the Polish Sejm 1952–1956
Members of the Polish Sejm 1957–1961
Members of the Polish Sejm 1961–1965
Polish male dramatists and playwrights
20th-century Polish dramatists and playwrights
Polish male novelists
20th-century Polish novelists
Polish male poets
20th-century Polish poets
Polish Army officers
Polish military personnel of World War II
Commanders of the Order of Polonia Restituta
Recipients of the Order of the Builders of People's Poland
Recipients of the Order of the Banner of Work
Stalin Peace Prize recipients
Burials at Powązki Military Cemetery
Recipients of the State Award Badge (Poland)